Huffman is an unincorporated community in southwest Craig County, Virginia.

It lies along State Route 42.

References
US Board on Geographic Names, http://geonames.usgs.gov/

Unincorporated communities in Craig County, Virginia
Unincorporated communities in Virginia